The 2010–11 Slovak Cup Final was the final match of the 2010–11 Slovak Cup, the 42nd season of the top cup competition in Slovak football. The match was played at the Štadión SNP in Banská Bystrica on 8 May 2011 between Slovan Bratislava and Žilina.

Road to the final

Match

Details 

Cup Final
Slovak Cup Finals
Slovak Cup
Slovak Cup
Slovak Cup Final 2011